Cuba competed at the 2004 Summer Olympics in Athens, Greece, from 13 to 29 August 2004. This was the nation's seventeenth appearance in the Olympics, except for some editions. Cuban athletes did not attend in two Olympic Games (1984 and 1988), where they joined the Soviet and North Korean boycott. Cuban Olympic Committee sent the nation's smallest delegation to the Games since 1972. A total of 151 athletes, 97 men and 54 women, competed in 18 sports.

The Cuban team featured seven defending Olympic champions from Sydney: taekwondo jin Ángel Matos in the men's welterweight division, the women's volleyball team (led by Yumilka Ruíz), boxers Mario Kindelán and Guillermo Rigondeaux, Greco-Roman wrestler Filiberto Azcuy, sprint hurdler Anier García, and long jumper Iván Pedroso, who later became the nation's flag bearer in the opening ceremony. Among the champions, Kindelan and Rigondeaux managed to defend Olympic titles in their respective weight categories. Skeet shooter Guillermo Alfredo Torres, the oldest athlete of the team at age 45, became the first Cuban athlete to compete in five Olympic Games since 1980; meanwhile, judoka Yamila Zambrano was the youngest of the team at age 18.

Cuba left Athens with a total of 27 Olympic medals (9 gold, 7 silver, and 11 bronze), failing only two golds short of the total record achieved from Sydney. Eight of these medals were awarded to the athletes in boxing, six in judo, and five in athletics. Cuba's team-based athletes proved successful in Athens, as men's baseball and women's volleyball teams won gold and bronze medals, respectively. Among the nation's gold medalists were Osleidys Menéndez, who previously won the bronze in Sydney and also, became the first non-European athlete to claim an Olympic title in women's javelin throw since María Caridad Colón did so in 1980. On August 23, 2004, the International Olympic Committee stripped off Russia's Irina Korzhanenko shot put title after failing the doping test for stanozolol, and the gold medal was subsequently awarded to Yumileidi Cumbá at the conclusion of the Games.

Medalists

|  style="text-align:left; width:72%; vertical-align:top;"|

|  style="text-align:left; width:23%; vertical-align:top;"|

Archery 

One Cuban archer qualified for the women's individual archery.

Athletics 

Cuban athletes have so far achieved qualifying standards in the following athletics events (up to a maximum of 3 athletes in each event at the 'A' Standard, and 1 at the 'B' Standard).

Yumileidi Cumbá originally claimed a silver medal in women's shot put. On August 23, 2004, the International Olympic Committee stripped off Russia's Irina Korzhanenko shot put title after failing the doping test for stanozolol. Following the announcement of Annus' disqualification, Cumba's medal was eventually upgraded to gold.

Men
Track & road events

Field events

Women
Track & road events

Field events

Baseball 

Roster
Manager: 39 – Higinio Vélez

Coach: 22 – Carlos Pérez Cepero, 30 – Pedro José Delgado Pérez, 34 – José Sánchez Elosegui, 41 – Francisco Laza Escaurrido Chapelle

Round robin

Semifinal

Gold Medal Final

Won Gold Medal

Boxing 

Cuba, by far the most successful country at boxing in the 2004 Olympics, entered a boxer in each of the 11 weight classes in Athens.  None of the seven boxers with a round of 32 match lost it.  Only one of the boxers fell in the round of 16 (also the only boxer not to win a match), with the other ten advancing to quarterfinals.  Two lost there, while the remaining eight ensured medals for themselves by winning their quarterfinal matches.  One lost in the semifinal, earning a bronze medal.  Of the seven Cuban boxers that advanced to the final bout in their weight classes, five won the match to take gold and two lost to claim silver medals.

Canoeing

Sprint

Qualification Legend: Q = Qualify to final; q = Qualify to semifinal

Cycling

Track
Sprint

Time trial

Omnium

Diving 

Cuban divers qualified for eight individual diving spots at the 2004 Olympic Games.

Men

Women

Fencing

Four Cuban fencers (two men and two women) qualified for the following events:

Men

Women

Gymnastics

Artistic
Men

Women

Judo

Twelve Cuban judoka (five men and seven women) qualified for the 2004 Summer Olympics.

Men

Women

Rowing

Cuban rowers qualified the following boats:

Men

Women

Qualification Legend: FA=Final A (medal); FB=Final B (non-medal); FC=Final C (non-medal); FD=Final D (non-medal); FE=Final E (non-medal); FF=Final F (non-medal); SA/B=Semifinals A/B; SC/D=Semifinals C/D; SE/F=Semifinals E/F; R=Repechage

Shooting 

Eight Cuban shooters (six men and two women) qualified to compete in the following events:

Men

Women

Swimming 

Cuban swimmers earned qualifying standards in the following events (up to a maximum of 2 swimmers in each event at the A-standard time, and 1 at the B-standard 
time):

Men

Women

Taekwondo

Two Cuban taekwondo jin qualified for the following events.

Volleyball

Beach

Indoor

Women's tournament

Roster

Group play

Quarterfinals

Semifinals

Bronze Medal Final

 Won Bronze Medal

Weightlifting 

Two Cuban weightlifters qualified for the following events:

Wrestling 

Men's freestyle

Men's Greco-Roman

See also
 Cuba at the 2003 Pan American Games
 Cuba at the 2004 Summer Paralympics

References

External links
Official Report of the XXVIII Olympiad

Nations at the 2004 Summer Olympics
2004
Summer Olympics